Eupithecia levata is a moth in the family Geometridae. It is found in south-western China (Yunnan).

The wingspan is about 20 mm. The fore- and hindwings are pale brown.

References

Moths described in 2004
levata
Moths of Asia